Axe Valley Academy, previously known as The Axe Valley Community College, is a coeducational secondary school and sixth form located in Axminster, Devon in the South West of England. The school was awarded specialist Business and Enterprise College status in September 2004, and has provided Post 16 education since the opening of a sixth form in September 2001. The sixth form is no longer in operation as of 2017. -Leilani Roberts

References

External links
Official school website

Secondary schools in Devon
Academies in Devon
Axminster